Amna Inayat Medical College is a medical school in Sheikhupura, Pakistan.It has a purpose build campus out of the city to provide Medical Students a natural environment. Medical college is going to be transformed into university.

External links

https://web.archive.org/web/20140419220757/http://www.aimcs.edu.pk/

Medical colleges in Punjab, Pakistan
Sheikhupura District